Plasmodium gemini is a parasite of the genus Plasmodium.  Like all Plasmodium species P. gemini has both vertebrate and insect hosts. The vertebrate hosts for this parasite are reptiles.

Description 

The parasite was first described by Perkins and Austin in 2008.

Geographical occurrence 

This species is found in New Guinea.

References 

gemini